Marcello Gazzola (born 3 April 1985) is an Italian former footballer who played as a defender.

Club career

Early career
Born in Borgo Val di Taro, Gazzola started his youth career at Parma in 1995. The defender remained within the youth system of the Emilia-Romagna based club until 2004 and began to earn first team call-ups during the 2003–2004 season, but never made his first team debut. Prior to the 2004–2005 season, Gazzola was sold to Serie C side S.S. Sambenedettese Calcio in a joint-ownership deal.

S.S. Sambenedettese Calcio
Gazzola joined the Serie C1 club in July 2004, at the age of 19. During his first season, he went on to make five full appearances and 14 appearances in 2005–06, before going out on two short loan spells to S.S.C. Venezia, one at the second half of the 2005–06 season and the second at the beginning of the 2006–07 season. At Venice, the young left back made just 2 appearances for the then-Serie C2 club. Gazzola transferred to Sassari Torres 1903 in January 2007.

Sassari Torres
Following his transfer to Sassari Torres, Gazzola played 14 games and scored 1 goal in his brief spell. After performing at an impressive level with the third division club, he was sold to Serie A side Calcio Catania at the start of the 2007–08 Serie A season.

Calcio Catania
Calcio Catania officially announced the signing of the player during the 2007 summer transfer window for an undisclosed fee. During his first season in Sicily, however,  Gazzola found playing time very limited due to his lack of experience and due to the presence of experienced full backs Cristian Silvestri, Gennaro Sardo and Rocco Sabato. On 1 August 2008, it was confirmed that Gazzola would spend the 2008–2009 season on loan at Serie B side US Avellino. With the club, Gazzola managed to obtain a starting position and made over 30 appearances in all competitions, but his efforts were not enough to save the club from relegation to the Lega Pro Prima Divisione, although the club were later relegated to the Serie D, following bankruptcy. He returned to Calcio Catania on 1 June 2009.

Ascoli Calcio
On 25 June 2009, Calcio Catania officially announced the signing of centerback Giuseppe Bellusci from Ascoli Calcio. In part exchange for the player, Ascoli received 50% of the contracts for both, Gazzola and Vito Falconieri. During his season with Ascoli, he made 33 Serie B appearances alone.

Sassuolo
On 1 July 2015, Gazzola signed a new one-year contract with Sassuolo. He renewed again on 27 May 2016.

Parma
On 16 January 2018, Gazzola left Sassuolo to join his former youth club Parma in Serie B for a reported £222,000 (€250,000) fee.

Loan to Empoli
On 24 August 2019, Gazzola joined Serie B club Empoli on loan with an option to buy.

References

External links
Marcello Gazzola at Goal.com

1985 births
Living people
Sportspeople from the Province of Parma
Association football defenders
Italian footballers
Serie A players
Serie B players
Serie C players
Parma Calcio 1913 players
Empoli F.C. players
A.S. Sambenedettese players
Catania S.S.D. players
U.S. Avellino 1912 players
Ascoli Calcio 1898 F.C. players
U.S. Sassuolo Calcio players
S.E.F. Torres 1903 players
Footballers from Emilia-Romagna